Adam Sawyer (born 7 January 1999) is an Australian professional footballer who plays as a midfielder for Western Pride FC in the National Premier Leagues Queensland.

Sawyer made his only A-League appearance as a late substitute in Brisbane Roar's 1–1 draw with Melbourne Victory FC on Saturday 11 November 2017.  

In 2019 Sawyer made 25 appearances for Lions FC which won the NPL Queensland Premiership in 2019.

Sawyer joined Western Pride before the start of the 2020 season. He joined Brisbane City for the 2021 season, before returning to Western Pride at the end of the season.

References

External links

1999 births
Living people
Australian soccer players
Association football midfielders
Brisbane Roar FC players
National Premier Leagues players
A-League Men players
Soccer players from Melbourne